Arene Altonaga Etxebarria (born 25 February 1993) is a Spanish footballer who plays for Eibar as a midfielder.

She began her senior career at Athletic Bilbao and made her Primera División debut in 2009, a week after her 16th birthday; however her progress was stalled by injury and appearances at that level were infrequent – she played mainly for the B team before leaving the club in 2015. She then spent two seasons with Oiartzun and one with Zaragoza (suffering relegation from the top tier with both clubs in successive years) prior to joining Eibar in 2018.

Arene played a minor role in the Eibar squad which gained promotion to the Primera in the 2019–20 season, having suffered a serious injury (rupturing the anterior cruciate ligament of her right knee) at the end of the previous campaign in a Copa Euskal Herria match against her former club Athletic. She had experienced a similar injury as a teenager. At the end of that season she and the club reached an agreement to extend her contract until 2022.

References

External links

 
Arene at BDFutbol

1993 births
Living people
People from Greater Bilbao
Sportspeople from Biscay
Footballers from the Basque Country (autonomous community)
Spanish women's footballers
Women's association football midfielders
SD Eibar Femenino players
Zaragoza CFF players
Oiartzun KE players
Athletic Club Femenino players
Athletic Club Femenino B players
Segunda Federación (women) players
Primera División (women) players
Spain women's youth international footballers
Primera Federación (women) players